Hervé Alicarte (born 7 October 1974) is a French former professional footballer who played as a defender.

His previous clubs include Montpellier HSC, Bordeaux, Toulouse FC, AC Ajaccio and Servette FC. In his time at Bordeaux he won Ligue 1 in the 1998–99 season and was on the bench when they won the 2002 Coupe de la Ligue Final.

Hervé's brother is Bruno Alicarte.

References

External links

1974 births
Living people
Sportspeople from Perpignan
Footballers from Occitania (administrative region)
Association football defenders
French footballers
French expatriate footballers
AC Ajaccio players
FC Girondins de Bordeaux players
Montpellier HSC players
Nîmes Olympique players
Servette FC players
Toulouse FC players
Ligue 1 players
Ligue 2 players
Championnat National players
Swiss Super League players
Expatriate footballers in Switzerland